Brenthia elachista is a species of moth of the family Choreutidae. It was described by Thomas de Grey, 6th Baron Walsingham in 1900. It is found on Christmas Island, a territory of Australia in the Indian Ocean.

References

Brenthia
Moths described in 1900